Anosh Irani (born 1974) is an Indo-Canadian novelist and playwright, born and raised in Mumbai.

Education
From 1998, Irani attended the University of British Columbia and received his bachelor's degree in creative writing in 2002. 

He has since taught creative writing at Simon Fraser University and McGill University. In September 2014, Irani was the writer-in-residence at Simon Fraser University in the world literature department.

Career
After working in advertising in India, he moved to Vancouver in 1998 to study and pursue writing.

His first full-length play, The Matka King, premiered in October 2003 at the Arts Club Theatre Company in Vancouver. His play, Bombay Black, won four Dora Awards, including Outstanding New Play. Irani was also featured in Quill & Quire as one of a handful of young Canadian "writers to watch."

He published his debut novel, The Cripple and His Talismans, in 2004. Irani's second novel, The Song of Kahunsha, was chosen as a CBC Book Club One pick, and selected for the 2007 edition of Canada Reads. His third novel, Dahanu Road, was published in 2010. His fourth, The Parcel, was published in 2016 and was shortlisted for that year's Rogers Writers' Trust Fiction Prize and Governor General's Award for English-language fiction.

His play My Granny the Goldfish premiered at The Revue Stage in Vancouver on 16 April 2010.

His play The Men in White was shortlisted for the Governor General's Award for English-language drama at the 2018 Governor General's Awards.

Works
 The Matka King (2003, play)
 The Cripple and His Talismans (2004, novel) , Raincoast Books
 The Song of Kahunsha (2006, novel) , Anchor Canada
 Bombay Black (2006, play)
 Dahanu Road (2010, novel) , Doubleday Canada
 My Granny the Goldfish (2010, play)
   The Parcel (2016, novel)
 Swimming coach. In Granta # 141, Canada, 2017, pp 123 – 135

References

External links
 Anosh Irani's Website

1974 births
Living people
Canadian male novelists
21st-century Canadian dramatists and playwrights
21st-century Canadian novelists
Dora Mavor Moore Award winners
Indian male novelists
Indian male dramatists and playwrights
Writers from Mumbai
Writers from Vancouver
Indian emigrants to Canada
Irani people
Canadian writers of Asian descent
Canadian male dramatists and playwrights
21st-century Canadian male writers